Divinity refers to the property or state of being a deity or godlike entity.

Divinity may also refer to:

 Divinity (academic discipline), the academic study of theology and religious ministry at a divinity school, university and seminary
 Divinity school, academic school attached to a university for the study of divinity
 Divinity (confectionery), type of confectionery
 Divinities: Twelve Dances with God, a 1995 album by Ian Anderson
 Divinity (band), a Canadian heavy metal band
 Divinity, a 2004 album by Altaria
 "Divinity", a song from the 2014 Porter Robinson album Worlds
 Divinity (TV channel), a Spanish television channel owned by Mediaset España
 Divinity, a video game series of role-playing games from Larian Studios
 Divine Divinity (2002)
 Beyond Divinity (2004)
 Divinity II (2009)
 Divinity: Dragon Commander (2013)
 Divinity: Original Sin (2014)
 Divinity: Original Sin 2 (2017)
 Divinity, a Valiant Comics superhero created by Matt Kindt
 Divinity (drag queen), Italian drag queen

People with the surname
Michael Divinity (born 1997), American football player

See also

Divine (disambiguation)